Le Yanwei (樂彥瑋) (died 676), courtesy name Degui (德珪), was an official of the Chinese Tang Dynasty, serving briefly as chancellor during the reign of Emperor Gaozong.

Le Yanwei was from the Tang capital Chang'an. As of 656, he was serving as imperial attendant, when Liu Hongye, the son of Liu Ji, a former chancellor who was accused of improprieties (comparing himself to historical regents Yi Yin and Huo Guang) and forced to commit suicide by Emperor Gaozong's father Emperor Taizong in 646, submitted a petition accusing the recently deposed chancellor Chu Suiliang of having falsely accused Liu Ji in 645. (Liu Hongye did so at the instigation of the chancellor Li Yifu, who was a political enemy of Chu and a former subordinate of Liu Ji.)  Emperor Gaozong consulted his officials, and they, wanting to ingratiate themselves with Li Yifu, an ally to Emperor Gaozong's powerful wife Empress Wu (later known as Wu Zetian), all were in favor of reversing the judgment on Liu Ji. Le, however, opposed this, stating:

Emperor Gaozong agreed and suspended further discussion. Soon thereafter, one of Le's parents died, and he left governmental service.  He was soon recalled to serve as the prefect of Tang Prefecture (唐州, roughly modern Nanyang, Henan). As he went to see the emperor to thank for the commission, Emperor Gaozong remembered his willingness to stand up to Li Yifu, and kept him at the central government's examination bureau (東臺, Dong Tai) as a mid-level official.  Around new year 665, Le was serving as Xi Tai Shilang -- the deputy head of the legislative bureau (西臺, Xi Tai) -- as well as a staff member for Emperor Gaozong's crown prince Li Hong, when he was given the designation Tong Dong Xi Tai Sanpin, making him a chancellor de facto. However, about four months later, both he and his colleague Sun Chuyue were no longer chancellors. He was instead made imperial censor, succeeding Liu Rengui. He was still imperial censor in 670 when the generals Xue Rengui, Guo Daifeng, and Ashina Daozhen suffered a major loss to Tufan forces commanded by its general Gar Trinring Tsendro ("Lun Qinling" in Chinese). Emperor Gaozong sent Le to the army to investigate, and he put Xue, Guo, and Ashina in chains and delivered them back to Chang'an, where Emperor Gaozong spared their lives but removed them from their posts.  Le died in 676 and was buried with honor. His son Le Sihui later also served as a chancellor, during the reign of Wu Zetian.

References 
 Old Book of Tang, vol. 81.
 New Book of Tang, vol. 99.
 Zizhi Tongjian, vol. 201.

Chancellors under Emperor Gaozong of Tang
676 deaths
Politicians from Xi'an
Year of birth unknown
Tang dynasty politicians from Shaanxi